Ilha Record (English: Record Island) is a Brazilian reality competition format originally created and aired by RecordTV. The series premiered on Monday, July 26, 2021 at  /  (BRT / AMT).

The show features a group of celebrities, known as Explorers, living together on a desert island and competing against each other in extreme challenges to avoid  being exiled and continue their quest for lost treasures and the grand prize of R$500.000. Prior to the live finale, a public vote is held to determine who would become the season's Favorite Explorer and win the special prize of R$250.000.

Season chronology

Ratings

References

External links
  on R7.com

 
2021 Brazilian television series debuts
2022 Brazilian television series endings
Brazilian reality television series
Portuguese-language television shows
RecordTV original programming